The Holitsynske gas field natural gas field located on the continental shelf of the Black Sea. It was discovered in 1974 and developed by Chornomornaftogaz. It started commercial production in 1975.

References

Natural gas fields in Ukraine
Black Sea energy
Economy of Crimea
Natural gas fields in the Soviet Union
Chornomornaftogaz property